Dara al-Kabira  is a Syrian village located in Kafr Nabl Nahiyah in Maarrat al-Nu'man District, Idlib.  According to the Syria Central Bureau of Statistics (CBS), Dara al-Kabira had a population of 692 in the 2004 census.

Syrian Civil War

On 27 March 2022, a soldier of the Syrian Arab Army was shot and killed by opposition forces in the village, which as of March 2022, was on the frontlines between Pro-Assad and opposition forces.

References 

Populated places in Maarat al-Numan District